The Maitland Manuscripts are an important source for the Scots literature of the Fifteenth and Sixteenth Centuries. They contain texts of the work of the makars of the period and much material which is not attributed to any author.

There are two manuscripts, one in quarto form and another in folio form.

The folio manuscript largely consists of works by the leading authors of the era. The quarto manuscript is dominated by Mailtand's own writing.

Both volumes were compiled by the judge, statesman and author Richard Maitland of Lethington during the Sixteenth Century. Many of the pieces in the manuscripts are his own work.

The manuscripts are held in the Pepys Library of Magdalene College, Cambridge

Authors represented in the manuscripts

Among the named authors whose works are contained in the manuscripts are,

Robert Henryson
William Dunbar
Gavin Douglas

References

Scottish manuscripts
16th-century manuscripts
Scots language
15th century in Scotland
16th century in Scotland
British anthologies
Scottish literature
Medieval Scottish literature
Middle Scots literature
Manuscripts in Cambridge
16th-century Scottish literature